The 2020–21 V-League season is the 17th season of the V-League, the highest professional volleyball league in South Korea. The season started in October 2020. Seoul Woori Card Wibee were the first placed male team when the season was cancelled last year and Suwon Hyundai E&C Hillstate were the first placed female team.

Teams

Men's clubs

Women's clubs

Season standing procedure 
 Match points
 Number of matches won
 Sets ratio
 Points ratio
 Result of the last match between the tied teams

 In the men's league, if the 4th-placed team finishes within three points of the 3rd placed team, an extra league game is played between these two teams.

Match won 3–0 or 3–1: 3 match points for the winner, 0 match points for the loser
Match won 3–2: 2 match points for the winner, 1 match point for the loser

Regular season

League table (Men's) 

 As Ansan were within three points of Uijeongbu, a quarter final play-off game was played, with Ansan winning 3-1.

Source: League table (Men's)

League table (Women's) 

Source: League table (Women's)

Results / Fixtures - Male

Rounds 1 and 2 

 = game played at away team's ground

Rounds 3 and 4

Rounds 5 and 6 

 = game played at away team's ground

Source: Game Schedule (Men's) Game Schedule

Results / Fixtures - Female

Rounds 1 and 2 

 = game played at away team's ground

Rounds 3 and 4 

 = game played at away team's ground

Rounds 5 and 6 

...

Source: Game Schedule (Women's)

Play-offs

Bracket (Men's )

Bracket (Women's)

Attendance 

Due to COVID restrictions, most games this season have been played behind closed doors. The games that have allowed an attendance have restricted crowds to only a few hundred.

Top Performers

Men's (Points)

Women's (Points)

Men's Spike (Attack Efficiency)

Women's Spike (Attack Efficiency)

Men's Blocking (Blocks per set)

Women's Blocking (Blocks per set)

Men's Serving (Aces per set)

Women's Serving (Aces per set)

Player of the Round

Men's

Women's

Final standing

Men's League

Women's League

Awards

Women's Regular season 

Most Valuable Player
 Kim Yeon-koung (Heungkuk Life)
Best Setter
 An Hye-jin (GS Caltex)
Best Outside Spikers
 Kim Yeon-koung (Heungkuk Life)
 Lee So-young (GS Caltex)

Best Middle Blockers
 Yang Hyo-jin (Hyundai Hillstate)
 Han Song-yi 
Best Opposite Spiker
 Valentina Diouf
Best Libero
 Yim Myung-ok

Women's Finals Series

 Most Valuable Player
 Lee So-young (GS Caltex)
 Merete Lutz (GS Caltex)

Men's Regular season 

Most Valuable Player
 Jung Ji-seok 
Best Setter
 Hwang Taek-eui 
Best Outside Spikers
 Jung Ji-seok 
 Alexandre Ferreira 

Best Middle Blockers
 Shin Yung-suk 
 Ha Hyeon-yong 
Best Opposite Spiker
 Noumory Keita
Best Libero
 Oh Jae-seong

Men's Finals Series

 Most Valuable Player
 Jung Ji-seok

Kovo Cup

Preliminary stage

Semifinal

Final

References

External links
 Official website 

V-League
V-League
V-League
V-League
V-League (South Korea)